Nicole Gerarda Everdina van Hooren (born 11 June 1973) is a Dutch former badminton player. She and Lotte Jonathans who were partnered since February 1998, competed at the 2000 Summer Olympics in Sydney, Australia, where the duo reached the quarter-finals, but lost to the Chinese pair of Huang Nanyan and Yang Wei.

Achievements

European Championships
Women's doubles

European Junior Championships 
Girls' doubles

Mixed doubles

IBF World Grand Prix
The World Badminton Grand Prix was sanctioned by the International Badminton Federation from 1983 to 2006.

Women's doubles

IBF International
Women's doubles

Mixed doubles

References

External links
 
 

1973 births
Living people
Sportspeople from 's-Hertogenbosch
Dutch female badminton players
Badminton players at the 2000 Summer Olympics
Olympic badminton players of the Netherlands
20th-century Dutch women